Coleophora pagodella is a moth of the family Coleophoridae. It is found in Turkestan and Uzbekistan.

The wingspan is about 12 mm.

The larvae feed on the fruit of Salsola species, including Salsola orientalis. They create a case by cutting each hollowed fruit and attaching it to the upper side of another fruit. Toward the end of development, the case consists of three, rarely four fruits. After completing development, larvae exit from the case by cutting a round opening in the last of the hollowed out fruits. They then move into the soil for hibernation, where they weave an oval, compact cocoon. The larvae are light yellow with a chocolate-brown head.

References

pagodella
Moths described in 1973
Moths of Asia